In phonetics and phonology, gemination, or consonant lengthening (from Latin  'doubling', itself from gemini 'twins'), is an articulation of a consonant for a longer period of time than that of a singleton consonant. It is distinct from stress. Gemination is represented in many writing systems by a doubled letter and is often perceived as a doubling of the consonant. Some phonological theories use "doubling" as a synonym for gemination, others describe two distinct phenomena.

Consonant length is a distinctive feature in certain languages, such as  Arabic, Berber, Danish, Estonian, Hindi, Hungarian, Italian, Japanese, Kannada, Punjabi, Polish and Turkish. Other languages, such as English, do not have word-internal phonemic consonant geminates.

Consonant gemination and vowel length are independent in languages like Arabic, Japanese, Finnish and Estonian; however, in languages like Italian, Norwegian and Swedish, vowel length and consonant length are interdependent. For example, in Norwegian and Swedish, a geminated consonant is always preceded by a short vowel, while an ungeminated consonant is preceded by a long vowel.

Phonetics
Lengthened fricatives, nasals, laterals, approximants and trills are simply prolonged. In lengthened stops, the obstruction of the airway is prolonged, which delays release, and the "hold" is lengthened.

In terms of consonant duration, Berber and Finnish are reported to have a 3-to-1 ratio, compared with around 2-to-1 (or lower) in Japanese, Italian, and Turkish.

Phonology
Gemination of consonants is distinctive in some languages and then is subject to various phonological constraints that depend on the language.

In some languages, like Italian, Swedish, Faroese, Icelandic, and Luganda, consonant length and vowel length depend on each other. A short vowel within a stressed syllable almost always precedes a long consonant or a consonant cluster, and a long vowel must be followed by a short consonant. In Classical Arabic, a long vowel was lengthened even more before permanently-geminate consonants.

In other languages, such as Finnish, consonant length and vowel length are independent of each other. In Finnish, both are phonemic;   'back',   'fireplace' and   'burden' are different, unrelated words. Finnish consonant length is also affected by consonant gradation. Another important phenomenon is sandhi, which produces long consonants at word boundaries when there is an archiphonemic glottal stop  >  'take it!'

Distinctive consonant length is usually restricted to certain consonants. There are very few languages that have initial consonant length; among them are Pattani Malay, Chuukese, Moroccan Arabic, a few Romance languages such as Sicilian and Neapolitan as well as many High Alemannic German dialects, such as that of Thurgovia. Some African languages, such as Setswana and Luganda, also have initial consonant length: it is very common in Luganda and indicates certain grammatical features. In colloquial Finnish and in Italian, long consonants occur in specific instances as sandhi phenomena.

The difference between singleton and geminate consonants varies within and across languages. Sonorants show more distinct geminate-to-singleton ratios while sibilants have less distinct ratios. The bilabial and alveolar geminates are generally longer than velar ones.

The reverse of gemination reduces a long consonant to a short one, which is called degemination. It is a pattern in Baltic-Finnic consonant gradation that the strong grade (often the nominative) form of the word is degeminated into a weak grade (often all the other cases) form of the word:  >  (burden, of the burden). As a historical restructuring at the phonemic level, word-internal long consonants degeminated in Western Romance languages: e.g. Spanish /ˈboka/ 'mouth' vs. Italian /ˈbokka/, both of which evolved from Latin /ˈbukka/.

Examples

Afroasiatic languages

Arabic
Written Arabic indicates gemination with a diacritic shaped like a lowercase Greek omega or a rounded Latin w, called the  : . For example, in Arabic, Form I verbs and Form II verbs differ only in the doubling of the middle consonant of the triliteral root in the latter form, e. g.,   is a Form I verb meaning to study, whereas   is the corresponding Form II verb, with the middle  consonant doubled, meaning to teach.

Berber
In Berber, each consonant has a geminate counterpart, and gemination is lexically contrastive. The distinction between single and geminate consonants is attested in medial position as well as in absolute initial and final positions.

 'say'
 'those in question'
 'earth, soil'
 'loss'
 'mouth'
 'mother'
 'hyena'
 'he was quiet'
 'pond, lake, oasis'
 'brown buzzard, hawk'

In addition to lexical geminates, Berber also has phonologically-derived and morphologically-derived geminates . Phonologically-derived geminates can surface by concatenation (e.g.  'give him two!') or by complete assimilation (e.g.   'he will touch you'). The morphological alternations include imperfective gemination, with some Berber verbs forming their
imperfective stem by geminating one consonant in their perfective stem (e.g.  'go! PF',  'go! IMPF'), as well as quantity alternations between singular and plural forms (e.g.  'hand',  'hands').

Austronesian languages
Austronesian languages in the Philippines, Micronesia, and Sulawesi are known to have geminate consonants.

Kavalan
The Formosan language Kavalan makes use of gemination to mark intensity, as in  'bad' vs.  'very bad'.

Malay dialects 
Word-initial gemination occurs in various Malay dialects, particularly those found on the east coast of the Malay Peninsula such as Kelantan-Pattani Malay and Terengganu Malay. Gemination in these dialects of Malay occurs for various purposes such as:

 To form a shortened free variant of a word or phrase so that:
   >  'give'
   >  'to/at/from the shore'
 A replacement of reduplication for its various uses (e.g. to denote plural, to form a different word, etc.) in Standard Malay so that:
   >  'children'
   >  'kite'

Tuvaluan
The Polynesian language Tuvaluan allows for word-initial geminates, such as  'overcooked'.

Indo-European languages

English
In English phonology, consonant length is not distinctive within root words. For instance, baggage is pronounced , not . However, phonetic gemination does occur marginally.

Gemination is found across words and across morphemes when the last consonant in a given word and the first consonant in the following word are the same fricative, nasal, or stop.

For instance:
 b: subbasement 
 d: midday 
 f: life force 
 g: egg girl 
 k: bookkeeper 
 l: guileless 
 m: calm man  or roommate  (in some dialects) or prime minister 
 n: evenness 
 p: lamppost  (cf. lamb post, compost)
 r: fire road 
 s: misspell  or this saddle 
 sh: fish shop 
 t: cattail 
 th: both thighs 
 v: live voter 
 z: pays zero 

With affricates, however, this does not occur. For instance:
 orange juice 

In most instances, the absence of this doubling does not affect the meaning, though it may confuse the listener momentarily. The following minimal pairs represent examples where the doubling does affect the meaning in most accents:

 ten nails versus ten ales
 this sin versus this inn
 five valleys versus five alleys
 his zone versus his own
 mead day versus me-day
 unnamed  versus unaimed 
 forerunner  versus foreigner  (only in some varieties of General American)

In some dialects gemination is also found for some words when the suffix -ly follows a root ending in -l or -ll, as in:
 solely 
but not
 usually 

In some varieties of Welsh English, the process takes place indiscriminately between vowels, e.g. in money  but it also applies with graphemic duplication (thus, orthographically dictated), e.g. butter

French
In French, gemination is usually not phonologically relevant and therefore does not allow words to be distinguished: it mostly corresponds to an accent of insistence ("c'est terrifiant" realised [ˈtɛʁ.ʁi.fjɑ̃]), or meets hyper-correction criteria: one "corrects" one's pronunciation, despite the usual phonology, to be closer to a realization that one imagines to be more correct: thus, the word illusion is sometimes pronounced [il.lyˈzjɔ̃] by influence of the spelling.

However, gemination is distinctive in a few cases. Statements such as She said ~ She said it /ɛl a di/ ~ /ɛl l‿a di/ can commonly be distinguished by gemination. In a more sustained pronunciation, gemination distinguishes the conditional (and possibly the future tense) from the imperfect: courrai (will run) /kuʁ.ʁɛ/ vs. courais (ran) /ku.ʁɛ/, or the indicative from the subjunctive, as in croyons (we believe) /kʁwa.jɔ̃ / vs. croyions (we believed) /kʁwaj.jɔ̃ /.

Greek

In Ancient Greek, consonant length was distinctive, e.g.,   'I am of interest' vs.   'I am going to'. The distinction has been lost in the standard and most other varieties, with the exception of Cypriot (where it might carry over from Ancient Greek or arise from a number of synchronic and diachronic assimilatory processes, or even spontaneously), some varieties of the southeastern Aegean, and Italy.

Hindustani
Gemination is common in both Hindi and Urdu. It does not occur after long vowels and is found in words of both Indic and Arabic origin, but not in those of Persian origin. In Urdu, gemination is represented by the Shadda diacritic, which is usually omitted from writings, and mainly written to clear ambiguity. In Hindi, gemination is represented by doubling the geminated consonant, enjoined with the Virama diacritic.

Aspirated consonants
Gemination of aspirated consonants in Hindi are formed by combining the corresponding non-aspirated consonant followed by its aspirated counterpart. In vocalised Urdu, the shadda is placed on the unaspirated consonant followed by the short vowel diacritic, followed by the do-cashmī hē, which aspirates the preceding consonant. There are few examples where an aspirated consonant is truly doubled.

Italian

Italian is notable among the Romance languages for its extensive geminated consonants. In Standard Italian, word-internal geminates are usually written with two consonants, and geminates are distinctive. Tonic syllables are bimoraic and are therefore composed of either a long vowel in an open syllable (as in ) or a short vowel in a closed syllable (as in ). In varieties with post-vocalic weakening of some consonants (e.g.  →  'reason'), geminates are not affected ( →  'May').

All consonants except  can be geminated. This word-initial gemination is triggered either lexically by the item preceding the lengthening consonant (e.g. by preposition  'to, at' in [a kˈkaːsa]  'homeward' but not by definite article  in [la ˈkaːsa]  'the house'), or by any word-final stressed vowel ([]  's/he spoke French' but []  'I speak French').

Latin
In Latin, consonant length was distinctive, as in  'old woman' vs.  'year'. Vowel length was also distinctive in Latin until about the fourth century, and was reflected in the orthography with an apex. It has been almost completely lost in French and completely in Romanian.

Nepali
Geminates occur only medially. Examples:

  – 'equal' ;   – 'honour'
  – 'disturb!' ;   – 'authority'
  – 'cook!' ;   – 'certain'

Norwegian

In Norwegian, gemination is indicated in writing by double consonants. Gemination often differentiates between unrelated words. As in Italian, Norwegian uses short vowels before doubled consonants and long vowels before single consonants. There are qualitative differences between short and long vowels:

  /   – 'method' / 'must'
  /   – 'to search' / 'to take off'
  /   – 'theirs' / 'anger'

Polish
In Polish, consonant length is indicated with two identical letters. Examples:

  – 'bathtub'
 
  – 'horror'
  or  – 'hobby'

Consonant length is distinctive and sometimes is necessary to distinguish words:

  – 'families';   – 'familial'
  – 'sacks, bags';   – 'mammals',
  – 'medicines';   – 'light, lightweight'

Double consonants are common on morpheme borders where the initial or final sound of the suffix is the same as the final or initial sound of the stem (depending on the position of the suffix). Examples:

Punjabi
Punjabi is written in two scripts, namely, Gurmukhi and Shahmukhi. Both scripts indicate gemination through the uses of diacritics. In contrast, the shadda, which is used to represent gemination in the Shahmukhi script, is not necessarily written, retaining the tradition of the original Arabic script and Persian language, where diacritics are usually omitted from writing, except to clear ambiguity, and is written above the geminated consonant. In the cases of aspirated consonants in the Shahmukhi script, the shadda remains on the consonant, not on the do-cashmī he.

Gemination is specially characteristic of Punjabi compared to other Indo-Aryan languages like Hindi-Urdu, where instead of the presence of consonant lengthening, the preceding vowel tends to be lengthened. Consonant length is distinctive in Punjabi, for example:

Russian
In Russian, consonant length (indicated with two letters, as in   'bathtub') may occur in several situations.

Minimal pairs (or chronemes) exist, such as   'to hold' vs   'to support', and their conjugations, or   'length' vs   'long' adj. f.

Word formation or conjugation:  ( 'length') >  ( 'long') This occurs when two adjacent morphemes have the same consonant and is comparable to the situation of Polish described above.
Assimilation. The spelling usually reflects the unassimilated consonants, but they are pronounced as a single long consonant.
 ( 'highest').

Spanish
There are phonetic geminate consonants in Caribbean Spanish due to the assimilation of /l/ and /ɾ/ in syllabic coda to the following consonant. Examples of Cuban Spanish:

Luganda
Luganda is unusual in that gemination can occur word-initially, as well as word-medially. For example,   'cat',   'grandfather' and   'madam' all begin with geminate consonants.

For example:
   'army' (root) >   'an army' (noun)
   'stone' (root) >   'a stone' (noun);  is usually spelt 
   'nation' (root) >   'a nation' (noun)
   'medicine' (root) >   'medicine' (noun)

Japanese

In Japanese, consonant length is distinctive (as is vowel length). For example,  means 'came; arrived', while  means 'cut; sliced'. With the influx of gairaigo ('foreign words') into Modern Japanese, voiced consonants have become able to geminate as well:  means '(computer) bug', and  means 'bag'.

Turkish
In Turkish gemination is indicated by two identical letters as in most languages that have phonemic gemination.

  
  

Loanwords originally ending with a phonemic geminated consonant are always written and pronounced without the ending gemination as in Arabic.

   (hajj) (from Arabic   pronounced )
   (Islamic calligraphy) (from Arabic   pronounced )

Although gemination is resurrected when the word takes a suffix.

  becomes   ('to hajj') when it takes the suffix "-a" ('to', indicating destination)
  becomes   ('of calligraphy') when it takes the suffix "-ın" ('of', expressing possession)

Gemination also occurs when a suffix starting with a consonant comes after a word that ends with the same consonant.

   ('hand') +   ("-s", marks plural) =   ('hands').
   ('to throw') +   ("-ed", marks past tense, first person plural) =   ('we threw [smth.]').

Malayalam
In Malayalam, compounding is phonologically conditioned so gemination occurs at words' internal boundaries.

Consider following example:

  +  ( + ) – 

Uralic languages

Estonian
Estonian has three phonemic lengths; however, the third length is a suprasegmental feature, which is as much tonal patterning as a length distinction. It is traceable to allophony caused by now-deleted suffixes, for example half-long  < * 'of the city' vs. overlong  < * < * 'to the city'.

Finnish

Consonant gemination occurs with simple consonants and between syllables in the pattern (consonant)-vowel-sonorant-stop-stop-vowel but not generally in codas or with longer syllables. (This occurs in Sami languages and in the Finnish name , which is of Sami origin.) Sandhi often produces geminates.

Both consonant and vowel gemination are phonemic, and both occur independently, e.g.

In Standard Finnish, consonant gemination of  exists only in interjections, new loan words and in the playful word hihhuli, with its origins in the 19th century, and derivatives of that word.

In many Finnish dialects there are also the following types of special gemination in connection with long vowels: the southwestern special gemination, with lengthening of stops + shortening of long vowel, of the type  < ; the common gemination, with lengthening of all consonants in short, stressed syllables, of the type  >  and its extension (which is strongest in the northwestern Savonian dialects); the eastern dialectal special gemination, which is the same as the common gemination but also applies to unstressed syllables and certain clusters, of the types  >  and  > .

Wagiman
In Wagiman, an indigenous Australian language, consonant length in stops is the primary phonetic feature that differentiates fortis and lenis stops. Wagiman does not have phonetic voice. Word-initial and word-final stops never contrast for length.

Writing
In written language, consonant length is often indicated by writing a consonant twice (ss, kk, pp, and so forth), but can also be indicated with a special symbol, such as the shadda in Arabic, the dagesh in Classical Hebrew, or the sokuon in Japanese.

In the International Phonetic Alphabet, long consonants are normally written using the triangular colon , e.g. penne  ('feathers', 'pens', also a kind of pasta), though doubled letters are also used (especially for underlying phonemic forms, or in tone languages to facilitate diacritic marking).

 Catalan uses the raised dot (called an interpunct) to distinguish a geminated  from a palatal .
 Estonian uses b, d, g for short consonants, and p, t, k and pp, tt, kk are used for long consonants.
 The only digraph in Ganda,   is doubled in the same way:  .
In Japanese, non-nasal gemination is denoted by placing the "small" variant of the syllable  ( or ) between two syllables, where the end syllable must begin with a consonant. For nasal gemination, precede the syllable with the letter for mora N ( or ). The script of these symbols must match with the surrounding syllables.
 In Swedish and Norwegian, the general rule is that a geminated consonant is written double, unless succeeded by another consonant. Hence  ('hall'), but  ('Halt!').

Double letters that are not long consonants
Doubled orthographic consonants do not always indicate a long phonetic consonant.

 In English, for example, the  sound of running is not lengthened. Consonant digraphs are used in English to indicate the preceding vowel is a short (lax) vowel, while a single letter often allows a long (tense) vowel to occur.
 In Standard Modern Greek, doubled orthographic consonants have no phonetic significance at all.
 Hangul (the Korean alphabet) and its romanizations also use double consonants, but to indicate fortis articulation, not gemination.
 In Klallam, a sequence of two  sounds such as in a word like  'sleep' is not pronounced like a geminated stop with a long closure duration – rather the sequence is pronounced as a sequence of two individual sounds such that the first  is released before the articulation of the second .

See also
Syntactic gemination
West Germanic gemination
Glottal stop
Length (phonetics)
Vowel length
Syllabic consonant
Index of phonetics articles

References

Consonants
Phonetics